The 2011 Chinalife Xingpai Hainan Classic was a professional non-ranking snooker tournament that took place between 10 and 13 March 2011 at the Boao Conference Center in Boao, China.

John Higgins won in the final 7–2 against Jamie Cope.

Prize fund
The breakdown of prize money for this year is shown below: 
Winner: £40,000
Runner-up: £18,000
Semi-finalists: £7,000
2nd in group: £3,500
3rd in group: £1,500
4th in group: £500
Highest break: £1,000
Maximum break: £5,000
Total: £100,000

Round-robin stage

Group A

Table

Results:
 John Higgins 2–1 Peter Ebdon
 Stephen Hendry 2–0 Li Yan
 Peter Ebdon 1–2 Stephen Hendry
 John Higgins 2–0 Stephen Hendry
 Peter Ebdon 2–0 Li Yan
 John Higgins 2–0 Li Yan

Group B

Table

Results:
 Neil Robertson 2–1 Cao Yupeng
 Jamie Cope 2–0 Jin Long
 Neil Robertson 1–2 Jamie Cope
 Cao Yupeng 1–2 Jin Long
 Cao Yupeng 0–2 Jamie Cope
 Neil Robertson 1–2 Jin Long

Group C

Table

Results:
 Ali Carter 2–0 Dennis Taylor
 Shaun Murphy 2–1 Tian Pengfei
 Shaun Murphy 1–2 Ali Carter
 Dennis Taylor 0–2 Tian Pengfei
 Shaun Murphy 2–0 Dennis Taylor
 Ali Carter 1–2 Tian Pengfei

*Ali Carter went through as he made the highest break in the group. (Carter 88, Murphy 67, Tian 52)

Group D

Table

Results:
 Graeme Dott 2–0 Ricky Walden
 Ding Junhui 0–2 Graeme Dott
 Ricky Walden 0–2 Yu Delu
 Ding Junhui 0–2 Yu Delu
 Ding Junhui 2–1 Ricky Walden
 Graeme Dott 2–1 Yu Delu

Knock-out stage

Charity exhibition match

Century breaks

 142  Jamie Cope
 141  Graeme Dott
 117, 113  Ding Junhui
 111, 109  John Higgins
 101  Neil Robertson
 101  Yu Delu

Notes

 Carter went through, because he made the highest break in the group. (Carter 88, Murphy 67 and Tian 52)

References

Snooker non-ranking competitions
2011 in snooker
2011 in Chinese sport
Snooker competitions in China